The 2015 Latvian Higher League is the 24th season of top-tier football in Latvia. FK Ventspils are the defending champions. The season started on 13 March 2015.

Teams 
FC Jūrmala relegated at the end of last season, and was replaced by FB Gulbene, which returned to the highest level after two years. Because FC Daugava did not obtain a license to play in the 2015 Higher League, and FK Daugava was dissolved before the beginning of the new season, the league started with 8 participants. On 3 June 2015, FB Gulbene was expelled from the top league and their results expunged on suspicion of match-fixing.

Stadiums and locations

Kits manufacturer and sponsors

League table

Relegation play-offs
The 7th-placed side will face the runners-up of the 2015 Latvian First League in a two-legged play-off, with the winner being awarded a spot in the 2016 Higher League competition.

FS METTA/LU won 9–3 on aggregate.

Results

Season statistics

Top scorers

Updated to match(es) played on 7 November 2015. Source:UEFA

References 

Latvian Higher League seasons
1
Latvia
Latvia